Eighth Ward may refer to:

8th Ward of New Orleans, a ward of New Orleans
Ward 8 (cocktail), a whiskey-based cocktail
Ward 8, St. Louis City, an aldermanic ward of St. Louis
Ward 8, one of the neighborhoods of Washington, D.C.
Ward 8, the name of several wards of Zimbabwe
College Ward, Ottawa (also known as Ward 8)